Loco is an unincorporated community in Childress County, in the U.S. state of Texas.

History
The first settlement at Loco was made in the 1880s. The community was named for locoweed found in the area.

References

Unincorporated communities in Texas
Unincorporated communities in Childress County, Texas